Time Reef is a Big Finish Productions audio drama based on the long-running British science fiction television series Doctor Who. It is a three part adventure, released with the single episode story that follows it, A Perfect World.

Plot
The Doctor and Nyssa have returned to the TARDIS to find it missing various pieces of equipment and its dimensions unstable. Thomas Brewster refuses to explain where he has been since he "borrowed" the TARDIS and what has happened to it. Drawn by a distress beacon, the TARDIS crash lands on a time reef where the interior subsequently implodes, leaving the companions stranded. They need to find their way back to normal space.

Brewster originally stole the TARDIS in The Haunting of Thomas Brewster, leaving the Doctor and Nyssa stranded in Victorian London. They regain the TARDIS in the following story, The Boy That Time Forgot.

Cast
The Doctor — Peter Davison
Nyssa — Sarah Sutton
Thomas Brewster – John Pickard
Commander Gammades – Nicholas Farrell
Lady Vuyoki – Beth Chalmers
The Ruhk – Sean Biggerstaff
Lucor – Sean Connolly

External links
Time Reef – Big Finish
 

2008 audio plays
Fifth Doctor audio plays